Luís Ángel Morales Rojas (born 22 October 1992) is a Mexican professional footballer who plays as an attacking midfielder for Tlaxcala.

Club career
Today he is one of the young promises of the Club Deportivo Guadalajara but has played only a few minutes with the first team. Morales has scored two goals and two assists in his debut season. He was transferred to Pachuca.

Honours
Tepatitlán
Liga de Expansión MX: Guardianes 2021
Campeón de Campeones: 2021

References

External links
 
 

1993 births
Living people
Mexican footballers
Association football forwards
C.D. Guadalajara footballers
C.F. Pachuca players
Atlético Morelia players
Correcaminos UAT footballers
Tlaxcala F.C. players
Mineros de Zacatecas players
La Piedad footballers
Liga MX players
Ascenso MX players
Liga de Expansión MX players
Liga Premier de México players
Tercera División de México players
Footballers from Guadalajara, Jalisco